Dąbie  is a town on the Ner River in central Poland with 1,940 inhabitants as of December 2021. It is situated in Koło County in Greater Poland Voivodeship.

History
In the 10th century, the area became part of the emerging Polish state under its first historic ruler Mieszko I. The town was first mentioned in 1232. Municipal status was granted in 1423. It was a royal town, administratively located in the Łęczyca Voivodeship in the Greater Poland Province of the Kingdom of Poland.

Before World War II, about 1,000 Jews lived in Dąbie. During the German occupation, they were confined to a ghetto in summer of 1940. Some were sent to forced labor camps, but most were sent directly to Chełmno extermination camp in December 1941 where they were gassed in specially adapted vans. Only a few Dąbie Jews survived the war.

Transport
Dąbie is located at the intersection of Voivodeship roads 263 and 473, and the A2 motorway runs nearby, south of the town.

Gallery

References

Cities and towns in Greater Poland Voivodeship
Koło County
Kalisz Governorate
Poznań Voivodeship (1921–1939)
Holocaust locations in Poland